Ruben Emir Gnanalingam (born 16 September 1976) is a Malaysian businessman.

Early life

Gnanalingam was born on 16 September 1976. He graduated from the London School of Economics and Political Science with a Bachelor of Science (Honours) Economics.

Westports

Gnanalingam joined Westports Malaysia in 2005, and was the Executive Director from 2006 to 2010. He then moved into the role of Chief Executive Officer (CEO), a position which, as of 2015, he still holds.

Queens Park Rangers

In 2015, he was named as co-chairman of Queens Park Rangers F.C., alongside Tony Fernandes, a position which he still holds as of 2016. On 15 August 2018, he and Tony Fernandes stepped down from co-chairmen to enable Amit Bhatia to take their spaces and become chairman.

Other work

Gnanalingam is as of 2015 a board member at Kuala Lumpur Business Club Malaysia.

Personal life

Gnanalingam is a Malaysian of Tamil and Chinese descent. His father is G. Gnanalingam, another prominent businessman, and his mother is Siew Yong Gnanalingam. As of 2015, he is married to Shirieene Hajamaideen.

References

External links
 Westports Malaysia Official Website

Queens Park Rangers F.C. directors and chairmen
Living people
1976 births
Malaysian businesspeople
Tamil businesspeople
Malaysian people of Tamil descent
Malaysian people of Chinese descent
Malaysian Muslims